Joseph Laws "Joe" Batchelder (born August 24, 1938) is an American sailor who competed in the 1964 Summer Olympics.

In 1964 he won the bronze medal as crew member of the American boat Bingo in the 5.5 metre class event.

He was born in Brookline, Massachusetts and lived in Marblehead, Massachusetts, for 50 years.

References

External links
 
 
 

1938 births
Living people
American male sailors (sport)
Olympic bronze medalists for the United States in sailing
Sailors at the 1964 Summer Olympics – 5.5 Metre
Medalists at the 1964 Summer Olympics
Sportspeople from Brookline, Massachusetts